The Great Steamboat Race is an annual steamboat race, taking place the Wednesday before the first Saturday of May, three days before the Kentucky Derby, as part of the Kentucky Derby Festival.  The race was first run in 1963 and it takes place on the Ohio River in the span that runs between Louisville, Kentucky and Jeffersonville, Indiana.  Until 2009, the race was traditionally between the Belle of Louisville and the Delta Queen, although other steamboats have participated.  Since 2009, the Delta Queen has not participated due to ownership and legal issues, and the Belle of Cincinnati has taken its place in the competition. In 2012, the Belle of Louisville and Belle of Cincinnati were joined in the race by the American Queen.

Format 

The race is scheduled annually as part of the Kentucky Derby Festival.  The event pits at least two riverboats against each other in the span of the Ohio River that runs between Louisville, Kentucky and Jeffersonville, Indiana.  Spectators can watch the event from the shore or aboard a competing vessel.

Traditional 

The race began underneath the George Rogers Clark Memorial Bridge, which served as the start/finish line. Both steamboats raced to Six Mile Island, where they turned around to return to the bridge. The competitors were traditionally the Belle of Louisville and the Delta Queen, although other additional or substitutionary vessels occasionally competed. The annual winner received the Golden Antlers, which would remain with the winner until the next race.

Modern 

2008 was the last year to feature the Delta Queen as a competitor prior to it being renovated into a dry-dock hotel; the Belle of Cincinnati has subsequently entered the races in the Queens stead.  In 2009, the event organizers changed the format prompting the Belle of Cincinnatis Capt. Kerry Snowden to note that "[t]here are no rules in riverboat racing, so whatever goes, goes".  The new format features a series of tasks that the crews must perform for points prior to the race. Because the Cincinnati is a diesel ship with more power, it is required to travel further to Harrods Creek. The boat with the most points after the race is determined to be the winner and is presented with the Silver Antlers, which take the place of the Golden Antlers that were retired when the Queen stopped competing.

The 2012 race featured, for the first time since 2008, once again two steam-powered boats as competitors, as well as the diesel-powered Belle of Cincinnati. The American Queen, returned to overnight steamboat service in April 2012, competed in the three-way race on May 2, 2012, and finished as second.

History 

The first Great Steamboat Race was held in 1963 between the Belle of Louisville and the Delta Queen, establishing the traditional rivalry until 2008 when the Queen was retired.  The Queen won the first race. As of the Delta Queens last race in 2008, the Louisville won 22 races compared to the Queens 20 wins.  The Louisville'''s winning record compared to the Queens larger size and more powerful engines has helped fuel the unproven speculation that the race is predetermined.

 Other competitors 

Several other riverboats have participated in the race:
 Julia Belle Swain competed in 1975 and 1976, the latter of which it won.
 Natchez IX of the New Orleans Steamboat Company in 1982, which it won.
 Spirit of Jefferson raced in 1999 in the Louisvilles stead while the Louisville was recovering from sabotage.  It is diesel-powered and has been used as an observation boat for the race.
 Belle of Cincinnati was a contestant in 2002, and followed as an observation boat in latter years.  Since 2009, it has replaced the Delta Queen as the annual competitor.  It is diesel-powered and has also been used as an observation boat for the race.
 American Queen competed for the first time in 2012, in a 3-way race with the Louisville and Cincinnati, finishing 2nd.
 American Duchess competed for the first time in 2018, in a 3-way race with the Cincinnati and Louisville'', finishing 1st.

Popular viewing areas for the race are the old Water Tower in Louisville, and along Utica Pike in Jeffersonville, especially near Duffy's Landing.

Results

See also
 List of attractions and events in the Louisville metropolitan area
 Thunder Over Louisville

References

External links 
 May 2 WHAS11 article 2007 results as well as details of judges decision
 Official Site  There is also an additional Official History page
 Brightcove review of the race Done by Curious Travelers
 May 1, 2007 Courier-Journal article Features a map of the race.
 Directory of steamboats/riverboats in the U.S. and Europe
 American Queen Web site
 Belle of Louisville Web site
 Belle of Cincinnati Web site
 Delta Queen Web site

Steamboats of the Ohio River
Kentucky Derby
Recurring sporting events established in 1963
1963 establishments in Kentucky
Water sports competitions
Boat races